Abrenthia is a genus of Glyphipterigidae (sedge moths). It was described by August Busck in 1915, and contains only one species Abrenthia cuprea. This species is found in North America, including Florida, Illinois and Iowa.

The wingspan is 9–12 mm. Adults have an orange head with black antennae. The forewings are dark metallic blue to greenish blue without markings. The hindwings are grey.

There is probably one generation per year. Adults have been recorded from mid-to late June.

See also
 List of butterflies of North America
 Lists of moths

References

External links
 "Abrenthia cuprea Busck 1915". Insecta.pro. Retrieved February 4, 2020.
 "Caught Between the Pages: Treasures from the Franclemont Collection". Online virtual exhibit featuring a selection of historic entomological writings and images from the Comstock Library of Entomology at Cornell University

Glyphipterigidae
Monotypic moth genera
Moths of North America